This is a list of media based in the Regional Municipality of Peel, Ontario, part of the Greater Toronto Area.

Radio

Television

The region is not home to any local television stations of its own beyond community stations operated by television service providers.

 Rogers TV (only available to Rogers Cable subscribers)
 TV1 (only available to Bell Fibe TV subscribers)

Over-the-air television service is entirely received from the neighbouring city of Toronto. 

However, several nationally distributed cable television services maintain their base of operations in the Peel region.

 The Shopping Channel, broadcasts nationally from Mississauga
 The Weather Network, formerly broadcast nationally from Mississauga (1988-2005)
 Makeful, Canada's first interactive television station.

Periodicals

 Languages: EN = English, FR = French, GU = Gujarati, HI = Hindi, LT = Lithuanian, PA = Punjabi, PT = Portuguese UR = Urdu
 Locations: BL = Bolton, BR = Brampton, CA = Caledon, MS = Mississauga, OK = Oakville, TT = Toronto Township

Newspapers

Bonjour Ontario, L'Action De London-Sarnia and Le Rempart are published from Brampton, but do not relate to Peel.

Magazines

References

Peel
 
 
Media, Peel